Michael John Bentley  (born 12 August 1948) is an English historian of British politics in the nineteenth and early twentieth centuries. He is Emeritus Professor of Modern History at the University of St Andrews.

Early life and career
Bentley was born in Rotherham, South Yorkshire, in 1948, the son of Peter and Jessie Bentley. He attended the University of Sheffield, graduating with a Bachelor of Arts degree in history in 1969, before proceeding to postgraduate study at St John's College, Cambridge.

From 1977 to 1995 Bentley taught history at Sheffield. He then moved to the University of St Andrews, where he was appointed Professor of Modern History; he is now Emeritus. As of 2021, he is Senior Research Fellow and Stipendiary Lecturer in History at St Hugh's College, Oxford. In 2011 he was made a fellow of the Royal Historical Society.

Critical reaction
Boyd Hilton has called Bentley's Politics Without Democracy 1815–1914 "a wonderfully 'inside' account of life at the top", whilst K. Theodore Hoppen claims the book "provides an interesting (if allusive) study of attitudes".

Personal life
Bentley is married to the historian Sarah Foot.

Works
The Liberal Mind, 1914–1929 (1977)
High and Low Politics in Modern Britain: Ten Studies (edited, with John Stevenson; 1983).
Politics Without Democracy, 1815–1914 (1984, 1996)
The Climax of Liberal Politics (1987)
Companion to Historiography (1997)
Modern Historiography: An Introduction (1998)
Lord Salisbury's World (2001)
Modernizing England's Past: English Historiography in the Age of Modernism, 1870–1970 (The Wiles Lectures) (2006)
The Life and Thought of Herbert Butterfield: History, Science and God (2011)

References

Further reading
 Middleton, Alex. "'High Politics' and Its Intellectual Contexts." Parliamentary History 40.1 (2021): 168–191. online

1948 births
Academics of the University of St Andrews
Alumni of St John's College, Cambridge
English historians
Fellows of St Hugh's College, Oxford
Living people